Harmful is a rock band from Frankfurt, Germany, founded in 1992 and frequently compared to early Helmet and more occasionally to Blackmail. The band has released eight albums to date, the first two and the last three on independent labels (BluNoise, Steamhammer and Nois-o-lution), the third (which was produced by Dave Sardy, who also produced the latest album Cause) and fourth via BMG.

2007 saw the release of Harmful's seventh album, aptly titled 7, produced by Billy Gould, former member of Faith No More. Gould has subsequently joined the band as a fourth member and also took part in the tour supporting the album in early 2007.

In the past, Harmful has toured with bands like Slayer, Machine Head, Clutch, Paradise Lost, Therapy?, LaFaro, and Helmet.

Discography 
 1995: Harmful (BluNoise)
 1997: Apoplexy.136 (BluNoise)
 2000: Counterbalance (Firestarter/BMG)
 2001: Wromantic (Firestarter/BMG)
 2003: Sanguine (Steamhammer/SPV)
 2005: Sis Masis (Nois-o-Lution/Indigo)
 2007: 7 (Nois-o-Lution/Indigo)
 2010: Cause (PIAS Recordings)
 2013: Sick and tired of being sick and tired (PIAS Recordings)

References

External links
Official website
[ Harmful] at Allmusic

German rock music groups